Matthew Mansfield (born 24 June 1969) is a former Australian rules footballer who played for the Footscray (now Western Bulldogs) Football Club in the Australian Football League. Originally recruited from the Glenorchy Football Club, Mansfield made his debut in the 1991 AFL season and played 32 games and kicked 5 goals until the 1993 AFL season. Mansfield played in 3 finals in the 1992 AFL season.

References

External links
 
 

Living people
1969 births
Glenorchy Football Club players
Western Bulldogs players
Australian rules footballers from Tasmania
Tasmanian State of Origin players